St Wilfrid's Church is a Roman Catholic church in Burgess Hill, West Sussex.

A former Congregational chapel in Grove Road served as Burgess Hill's Roman Catholic church until St Wilfrid's was built by a local firm in 1940.  Frank Brangwyn provided the Stations of the Cross and Joseph Cribb, a pupil of Eric Gill, carved the statue of Saint Wilfrid above the entrance.

It is part of the Diocese of Arundel and Brighton.

It is associated with St Wilfrid's Catholic Primary School.

References

Bibliography

Burgess Hill
Burgess Hill